Stigmella populetorum is a moth of the family Nepticulidae. It is found in North America in Texas, Ohio, Kentucky, California, Ontario and British Columbia.

The wingspan is about 5 mm. Late instar larvae have been found in mid-June and August. Adults have been found from late June through to September. There are two and possibly three generation per year.

The larvae feed on Populus species, including Populus deltoides, Populus trichocarpa, Populus nigra italica and Populus x canadensis. They mine the leaves of their host plant. The mine is placed on the upper or the lower side of the leaf. It is a whitish, gradually broadening linear track, with a black line of frass. The cocoon is ochraceous.

External links
Nepticulidae of North America
A taxonomic revision of the North American species of Stigmella (Lepidoptera: Nepticulidae)

Nepticulidae
Moths of North America
Moths described in 1878